This article shows the rosters of all participating teams at the 2017 FIVB Volleyball Girls' U18 World Championship in Argentina.

Pool A

The following is the Argentinian roster in the 2017 FIVB Girls' U18 World Championship.

Head coach: Estanislao Vachino

The following is the German roster in the 2017 FIVB Girls' U18 World Championship.

Head coach: Jens Tietböhl

The following is the Slovenian roster in the 2017 FIVB Girls' U18 World Championship.

Head coach: Joze Casar

The following is the Korean roster in the 2017 FIVB Girls' U18 World Championship.

Head coach: Cho Wan-ki

The following is the Cuban roster in the 2017 FIVB Girls' U18 World Championship.

Head coach: Tomas Fernandez

Pool B

The following is the American roster in the 2017 FIVB Girls' U18 World Championship.

Head coach: Jim Stone

The following is the Russian roster in the 2017 FIVB Girls' U18 World Championship.

Head coach: Alexander Karikov

The following is the Belarusian roster in the 2017 FIVB Girls' U18 World Championship.

Head coach: Natallia Melianiuk

The following is the Brazilian roster in the 2017 FIVB Girls' U18 World Championship.

Head coach: Mauricio Thomas

The following is the Mexican roster in the 2017 FIVB Girls' U18 World Championship.

Head coach: Jesus Ricardo

Pool C

The following is the Italian roster in the 2017 FIVB Girls' U18 World Championship.

Head coach: Marco Mencarelli

The following is the Serbian roster in the 2017 FIVB Girls' U18 World Championship.

Head coach: Jovo Cakovic

The following is the Polish roster in the 2017 FIVB Girls' U18 World Championship.

Head coach: Rafal Gasior

The following is the Colombian roster in the 2017 FIVB Girls' U18 World Championship.

Head coach: Antonio Rizola

The following is the Thai roster in the 2017 FIVB Girls' U18 World Championship.

Head coach: Jarun Niemtubtim

Pool D

The following is the Chinese roster in the 2017 FIVB Girls' U18 World Championship.

Head coach: Xu Jiande

The following is the Turkish roster in the 2017 FIVB Girls' U18 World Championship.

Head coach: Sahin Catma

The following is the Japanese roster in the 2017 FIVB Girls' U18 World Championship.

Head coach: Daichi Saegusa

The following is the Peruvian roster in the 2017 FIVB Girls' U18 World Championship.

Head coach: Marco Queiroga

The following is the Dominican roster in the 2017 FIVB Girls' U18 World Championship.

Head coach: Alexandre Ceccato

References

External links
 Official website

FIVB Women's U18 World Championship
FIVB Volleyball World Championship squads